In botany, a sinus is  a space or indentation between two lobes or teeth, usually on a leaf. The term is also used in mycology. For example, one of the defining characteristics of North American species in the Morchella elata clade  of morels is the presence of a sinus where the cap attaches to the stipe.

See also
Leaf shape
 Sulcus (morphology)

References

Plant morphology
Fungal morphology and anatomy